Terror is a Viceland documentary series featuring Suroosh Alvi.

The series won the Canadian Screen Award for Best News or Information Series at the 6th Canadian Screen Awards.

References 

2010s Canadian documentary television series
Viceland original programming
2017 Canadian television series debuts